

Qualification system
A total of 140 judokas (ten per weight category) will qualify to compete at the games. There will be six qualification events for athletes to earn ranking points, and the top nine nations qualify per event. The host nation (Canada) is automatically qualified in each event, for a total of ten per event. If the host nations is not ranked in the top ten places, Canada will take the place of the tenth ranked nation. If Canada is ranked in the top nine nations, the tenth ranked nation will qualify instead. A nation may enter a maximum of one athlete per weight category.

Qualification timeline

Qualification summary
The final list of countries qualified was published by the Pan American Judo Confederation on April 25, 2015.

Men

60kg

66kg

73kg

81kg

90kg

100kg

+100kg

Women

48kg

52kg

57kg

63kg

70kg

78kg

+78kg

References

Qualification
2015
Qualification for the 2015 Pan American Games
American Games, Qualification